The Port of Sarandë or Sarandë Harbor (Greek: Λιμάνι των Αγίων Σαράντα) is a port of Albania in the city of Sarandë, Albania. As of 2012, the port is undergoing an expansion to include a cruise line terminal. Stemming from the small size of the port, cruise lines cannot dock at the port. Instead, a fast boat serves tourists back and forth between cruises and the port.

Photos

See also
Sarandë
Transport in Albania
Economy of Albania
Tourism in Albania
Albanian Riviera

External links
Port homepage

References

Sarandë
Sarande